Max or MAX may refer to:

Animals
 Max (dog) (1983–2013), at one time purported to be the world's oldest living dog
 Max (English Springer Spaniel), the first pet dog to win the PDSA Order of Merit (animal equivalent of OBE)
 Max (gorilla) (1971–2004), a western lowland gorilla at the Johannesburg Zoo who was shot by a criminal in 1997
 Max, the Grinch's dog in How the Grinch Stole Christmas! by Dr. Seuss
 Max, the Belgian Malinois military dog, in the 2015 film of the same name

Brands and enterprises
 Australian Max Beer
 Max Hamburgers, a fast-food corporation
 MAX Index, a Hungarian domestic government bond index
 Max Fashion, an Indian clothing brand

Computing
 MAX (operating system), a Spanish-language Linux version
 Max (software), a music programming language
 Commodore MAX Machine
 Multimedia Acceleration eXtensions, extensions for HP PA-RISC

Films
 Max (1994 film), a Canadian film by Charles Wilkinson
 Max (2002 film), a film about Adolf Hitler
 Max (2015 film), an American war drama film

Games
 Dancing Stage Max, a 2005 game in the Dance Dance Revolution series
 DDRMAX Dance Dance Revolution or MAX, a North American music video game
 DDRMAX Dance Dance Revolution 6thMix or MAX, a 2001 Japanese music video game
 M.A.X.: Mechanized Assault & Exploration, a computer game

Literature
Max (book series), a children's book series by Barbro Lindgren and Eva Eriksson
 Max (children's book), a children's book by Bob Graham
 Max (Fast novel), a 1982 novel by Howard Fast
 MAX: A Maximum Ride Novel, a novel by James Patterson

Magazines
 Max (French magazine) 
 Max (German magazine) (1991–2008)
 Max (Italian magazine) (1985–2013)
 Max, a 1990s Australian magazine later retitled Maxim
 Max, a Mexican magazine

Music 
 MAX (group), a Japanese vocal group
 Max Schneider, better known by the mononym MAX, American singer
 Max (album), a 2015 album by Max Mutzke
 MAX (album), a 1958 album by Max Roach
 Max, a 1977 album by The Rumour

People and fictional characters
 Max (given name), including nicknames and fictional characters
 Max (surname)
 Max Schneider (born 1992), American singer known as MAX
 Max (Korean singer), stage name of Korean singer Shim Chang-min (born 1988)
 Max (Portuguese singer), fado singer
 Max (Spanish cartoonist) (born 1956)
 Max (1872–1956), British cartoonist sir Max Beerbohm

Places

United States 
 Max, Indiana, an unincorporated community
 Max Township, Itasca County, Minnesota
 Max, Minnesota, an unincorporated community
 Max, Missouri, a ghost town
 Max, Nebraska, an unincorporated community and census-designated place
 Max, North Dakota, a town

Elsewhere 
 El Max, Alexandria, Egypt, a neighborhood

Television

Channels and networks
 Max (Australian TV channel)
 Max (Canadian TV channel)
 Max (Norwegian TV channel)
 Omroep MAX, a Netherlands TV broadcaster
 Sony Max, an Indian pay television channel
 Sony MAX (South Africa)
 Cinemax or Max, a US television network

Episodes
 "Max" (The X-Files)
 "Max", a 1978 episode of The Bionic Woman

Transportation 
 MAX (Calgary), a bus system in Calgary, Alberta, Canada
 MAX (Utah Transit Authority), a bus line in Salt Lake County, Utah, US
 MAX Bus Rapid Transit (Colorado), a bus system in Fort Collins, Colorado, US
 MAX Light Rail, a rail service in Portland, Oregon, US
 Arriva Max, a UK bus service brand
 Boeing 737 MAX, an airliner made by the American company Boeing
 Dudek Max, a Polish paraglider design
 Moyes Max, an Australian hang glider design
 Madera Area Express (now Madera Metro), a transit agency in Madera, California, US
 Metro Area Express (Perth), a proposed light rail system in Perth, Western Australia
 Metropolitan Area Express BRT Line or MAX, a bus system in Las Vegas, Nevada, US
 Metro Arlington Xpress, a public transit system in Texas, US
 Modesto Area Express (now Stanislaus Regional Transit Authority), a transit agency in Modesto, California, US
 E1 Series Shinkansen or Max, a bullet train in Japan
 E4 Series Shinkansen or Max, a bullet train in Japan

Other uses
 Max (comics), sometimes stylized as MAX Comics, a Marvel Comics imprint aimed at adult-only readers
 MAX (gene), a human gene
 Maxillaria or Max, an orchid genus
 The Max, a fictitious hangout on Saved by the Bell (also featured on The New Class and the 2020 reboot)
 The Max, a nickname for the Pakistan Hockey Super League, field hockey
 max and min, operations to obtain maximal and minimal elements

See also 
 
 

 Macx (disambiguation)
 Macs (disambiguation)
 Mad Max (disambiguation)
 MAKS (disambiguation)
 Maxie (disambiguation)
 Maximilian (disambiguation)
 Maximus (disambiguation)
 Maxx (disambiguation)
 Mighty Max (disambiguation)